The Spirit of Romance is a lost 1917 American drama silent film directed by E. Mason Hopper, written by Adele Harris and George S. Hopkins, and starring Vivian Martin, Percy Challenger, Colin Chase, Herbert Standing, Elinor Hancock and George Fisher. It was released on March 22, 1917, by Paramount Pictures.

Plot

Cast 
Vivian Martin as Abby Lou Maynard
Percy Challenger as Richard Cobb
Colin Chase as Tom Cobb
Herbert Standing as Joseph Snow
Elinor Hancock as Mrs. Rollins
George Fisher as Percival Rollins
Daisy Jefferson as Marguerite D'Arcy
Doc Crane as Mace
John Burton

References

External links 
 

1917 films
1910s English-language films
Silent American drama films
1917 drama films
Paramount Pictures films
Films directed by E. Mason Hopper
American black-and-white films
American silent feature films
Lost American films
1917 lost films
Lost drama films
1910s American films